John_Estaugh (1742) was an American Quaker minister in colonial New Jersey.

He was a minister who first met Elizabeth Haddon in England. He came to America to preach and later settled in Haddonfield, New Jersey. 

Haddon met up with John and proposed to him and they were married in 1702.  Their love story is immortalized in the work of Henry Wadsworth Longfellow's Tales of a Wayside Inn.

Later years
John went on a religious trip to Tortola in the West Indies in 1742. He died there, and is presumed to be buried there as well.

References

1670s births
1742 deaths
People from Southwark
People of colonial New Jersey
People from Haddonfield, New Jersey
17th-century Quakers
18th-century Quakers
American Quakers
English emigrants